Chen Zongxing (born June 1943) was a Chinese male politician, who served as the vice chairperson of the Chinese People's Political Consultative Conference.

References 

1943 births
Living people
Vice Chairpersons of the National Committee of the Chinese People's Political Consultative Conference